Kudzanai-Violet Hwami (born 1993) is a Zimbabwean painter who lives and works in London, England. Her work explores sexuality, race and gender. 

She was born in Gutu, Zimbabwe, where she lived until she was nine. From age nine to seventeen, she lived in South Africa. At age 17, she moved to London, England.

Hwami was included in the 2019 Venice Biennale. In 2020 Hwami was included in Apollo magazine's "40 Under 40 Africa". 

Her work is included in the permanent collection of the Zeitz MOCAA museum, South Africa.

References

Living people
1993 births
21st-century Zimbabwean women artists